The Film Collaborative (TFC) is the first non-profit, full-service provider dedicated to the distribution of independent film, including narrative features and documentaries. Based in Los Angeles, The Film Collaborative services filmmakers worldwide by providing distribution guidance and support as well as theatrical, film festival and digital distribution of art house, independent and world cinema.

History 
Launched in 2010, The Film Collaborative is a service-oriented, educational organization aimed at encouraging and enabling independent filmmakers to forge their own brands and directly reach audiences with their work. TFC educates filmmakers about marketing and distribution options with the objective to eliminate unnecessary middlemen and break away from the restrictive contract terms that are prevalent in the film industry so that creators, rather than corporations, may profit from their own work. An ardent advocate of new media/digital distribution, TFC encourages filmmakers to use the global reach of the internet for digital marketing and forging an ongoing relationship with their audiences.

Festival Distribution 
In 2010, TFC did festival distribution for films such as Eyes Wide Open, The Owls, Florent, A Small Act, The Adults in the Room, How to Start Your Own Country, An African Election and Undertow.

TFC's 2011 slate included August, Codependent Lesbian Space Alien Seeks Same, Facing Mirrors, Hit So Hard, The Invisible War, I Want Your Love, Leave It on the Floor, Mosquita y Mari, Revenge of the Electric Car, Shut Up Little Man!, Some Guy Who Kills People, Vito, Weekend, We Were Here and The Wise Kids.

TFC's 2012 slate included A Fierce Green Fire, Interior. Leather Bar., Jobriath A.D., The New Black, A River Changes Course, Gayby, A Portrait of James Dean: Joshua Tree, 1951, Taking a Chance on God, Trans, United in Anger and Valley of Saints.

TFC's 2013 slate included I am Divine, Born This Way, G.B.F., Gore Vidal: The United States of Amnesia, The Happy Sad, Kink, Pit Stop and Valentine Road.

TFC's 2014 slate included Appropriate Behavior, Born to Fly, Boy Meets Girl, Cesar's Last Fast, Five Star, The Immortalists, Kidnapped For Christ, Out in the Night, Regarding Susan Sontag, Song From the Forest, (T)ERROR, To Be Takei and The Year We Thought About Love.

TFC's 2015 slate included All About E, All Eyes and Ears, The Amina Profile, The Armor of Light, The Bad Kids, The Hunting Ground, I Promise You Anarchy, Landfill Harmonic, Naz & Maalik, The New Man, Out to Win, Portrait of a Serial Monogamist, Racing Extinction, The Royal Road, Salero, Seed Money, Tab Hunter Confidential, Those People, Uncle Howard and While You Weren't Looking.

TFC's 2016 slate included AWOL, Boone, Cameraperson, Equal Means Equal, Forever Pure, Hooligan Sparrow, Hunky Dory, Icaros, Jewel's Catch One, The Last Laugh, Maya Angelou And Still I Rise, Out Run, A Song For You, Tower, Untouchable and Women Who Kill.

Slate

Educational Tools 

In 2011, TFC launched a free suite of online resources for filmmakers called Distripedia and have been expanding it ever since. Distripedia includes ResourcePlace, the Digital Distribution Guide, TFC Case Studies, the TFC Blog, [Distributor ReportCard] and the :20 in '22 interview series.
The Digital Distribution Guide is a platform-focused listing of digital streaming platforms across the globe. It also provides links to platform-specific news items dating back to 2010.
Analytical film distribution TFC Case Studies, which are released on an ongoing basis, highlight the distribution journeys of a variety of films—those of different genres, subject matters, levels of success, etc.—and cover topics ranging from sales agents, distributors, and self-distribution to reaching an online audience, creating impact campaigns with calls-to-action, and being pigeonholed in one's film niche.
ResourcePlace provides a wide array of online services on topics that are essential to today's filmmaker. The Film Collaborate maintains this list of vendors and services via recommendations from filmmakers and other industry folks and/or our own first-hand experience with them.
The TFC Blog, written by the TFC staff and a select industry guest writers, focuses on what's new in distribution and the digital distribution world. Topics include educational distribution, blockchain, digital strategy, fair use, and more.
Distributor ReportCard, which will ultimately include at least 40 forthcoming distributors, is a "Zagat"-like guide anonymously collates filmmakers' real experiences with distribution companies, in their own words. It gives filmmakers the opportunity to learn from their fellow filmmakers, allowing them to understand and avoid some of the pitfalls of traditional distribution, while simultaneously helping them choose the best fit for their film.
The short video interview series, entitled :20 in '22, features members of the TFC team as they engage in informal 20-minute chats with filmmakers, programmers, distributors, exhibitors, distribution experts, and other industry professionals on pressing film-distribution-related topics in these tumultuous and unpredictable times.

Consultation Services 

TFC offers distribution and marketing education to independent filmmakers seeking to reach traditionally underserved audiences. Via its membership and digital distribution programs, TFC guides filmmakers through the distribution process and helps them develop a custom strategy suitable for their film.

Fiscal Sponsorship 

In 2012, TFC launched a Fiscal Sponsorship program, enabling filmmakers to contract with TFC to extend tax-exempt status to their specific projects, rather than attempting to secure tax-exempt status on their own.

Collaborative Releasing 
In late 2010, The Film Collaborative spearheaded the theatrical release of Javier Fuentes-León's ghostly love story Undertow (Contracorriente), which was Peru's Official Selection to the Academy Awards for Best Foreign Language Film that year. In 2012, they released Jonathan Lisecki's alternative parenting romantic comedy-drama Gayby and Aurora Guerrero's coming-of-age film Mosquita y Mari.

In 2014, The Film Collaborative's theatrical releases included Switzerland's Official Selection to the 2015 Academy Awards for Best Foreign Language Film, The Circle (Der Kreis), Born to Fly: Elizabeth Streb vs. Gravity, Catherine Gund's documentary about the life and work of choreographer and action architect Elizabeth Streb, LGBT film historiographer-director Jeffrey Schwarz's I am Divine, about the international drag superstar and John Waters' leading lady Divine, Darius Clark Monroe's Evolution of a Criminal and The Hand that Feeds.

In 2015, The Film Collaborative's theatrical releases included Jeffrey Schwarz's Tab Hunter Confidential, Lyric R. Cabral and David Felix Sutcliffe's (T)ERROR, which won the Special Jury Award for Breakout First Feature at the 2015 Sundance Film Festival. TFC also released Parvez Sharma's A Sinner in Mecca, Song from the Forest, and 1971, which focuses on a break-in of an FBI office that occurred that year in Media, Pennsylvania to steal over 1000 classified documents.

Requiem for the American Dream, featuring famed historian Noam Chomsky,  began its release on January 29, 2016. TFC released Nanfu Wang's documentary about a Chinese activist, entitled Hooligan Sparrow, on July 22, 2016. The Film Collaborative, along with Emerging Pictures, will handle theatrical distribution for Landfill Harmonic (2016). The film will open theatrically in North America on September 9, 2016. TFC partnered with Gravitas Ventures to release For the Love of Spock theatrically on Sept. 9, 2016.

In November 2016, The Film Collaborative launched Collaborative Releasing as a new distribution initiative that combines film sales and licensing with a hybrid release plan. TFC also rebranded its Theatrical Releasing services under the Collaborative Releasing umbrella.

Collaborative Releasing handled the 2018 North American theatrical release of The Song of Sway Lake, directed by Ari Gold.

Sales and Business Negotiation 
In 2011, The Film Collaborative helped negotiate a deal for Andrew Haigh's Weekend. In 2012, TFC launched a new foreign sales initiative for LGBT titles with Peccadillo (UK), Outplay (France), Pro-Fun (Germany), ABC/Cinemien (Benelux) to share resources and launch films simultaneously in multiple territories when possible to maximize awareness and limit piracy. In 2016, The Film Collaborative was a key player in orchestrating a splits right deal for the film Landfill Harmonic involving Vimeo (Digital), HBO Latino (Television), Tugg (Educational) and FilmRise (DVD).

Recent Press 

Filmmaker Magazine, November 4, 2022
"We Had Made This Film Against All Odds... Why Not Take On This Last Chapter of the Film's Journey Ourselves?": You Resemble Me Producer Elizabeth Woodward on Embracing Self-Distribution

Screen Daily, November 23, 2016 
At the Film Bazaar in Goa, India, Orly Ravid from The Film Collaborative advises filmmakers to use grassroots outreach and social media marketing.

Variety, November 14, 2016 
The Film Collaborative Launches Collaborative Releasing

References

External links 
 

Non-profit organizations based in Los Angeles
Film distributors of the United States
Organizations established in 2010
2010 establishments in California